Camping World RV 400 may refer to::

 Camping World RV 400 (Dover), a NASCAR auto race held at Dover International Speedway in 2008.
 Camping World RV 400 presented by Coleman, the 2008 NASCAR race held at Kansas Speedway.